Grace Episcopal Church, or variants thereof, may refer to the following:

United States
(by state then city)

Alabama
Grace Episcopal Church (Anniston, Alabama), listed on the National Register of Historic Places (NRHP) in Calhoun County, Alabama
Grace Episcopal Church (Clayton, Alabama), listed on the NRHP in Barbour County, Alabama
Grace Episcopal Church (Mount Meigs, Alabama), listed on the NRHP in Montgomery County, Alabama

Arkansas
 Grace Episcopal Church (Wynne, Arkansas)

California
 Grace Episcopal Church (Boulder Creek, California)
Grace Episcopal Church (St. Helena, California)
Grace Episcopal Church (San Marcos, California)]]

Colorado
 Grace Episcopal Church (Buena Vista, Colorado), listed on the NRHP in Chaffee County, Colorado
Grace and St. Stephen's Episcopal Church, Colorado Springs, Colorado
Grace Episcopal Church (Georgetown, Colorado), NRHP-listed, in Clear Creek County

Florida
 Grace Episcopal Church and Guild Hall (Port Orange, Florida),

Indiana
 Grace Episcopal Church (Muncie, Indiana), located in Delaware County, Indiana, is a parish of the Episcopal Diocese of Indianapolis

Illinois
 Grace Episcopal Church (Chicago)
 Grace Episcopal Church (Galena, Illinois)
 Grace Episcopal Church (Oak Park, Illinois)

Kentucky
 Grace Episcopal Church (Hopkinsville, Kentucky), NRHP-listed
 Grace Episcopal Church (Paducah, Kentucky), NRHP-listed

Louisiana
 Grace Episcopal Church (St. Francisville, Louisiana), NRHP-listed
Grace Episcopal Church (New Orleans, Louisiana)

Maine
 Grace Episcopal Church (Robbinston, Maine), NRHP-listed

Maryland
 Grace and St. Peter's Church, Mount Vernon, Baltimore
 Grace Episcopal Church (Mt. Vernon, Maryland), NRHP-listed
 Grace Episcopal Church Complex (Taylor's Island, Maryland), NRHP-listed
 Grace Reformed Episcopal Church, Havre de Grace, Maryland, NRHP historic district contributing property

Massachusetts
 Grace Episcopal Church (Amherst, Massachusetts)
 Grace Episcopal Church (Lawrence, Massachusetts), listed on the NRHP in Massachusetts
 Grace Episcopal Church (Medford, Massachusetts), listed on the NRHP in Massachusetts

Michigan
 Grace Episcopal Church in East Grand Rapids, Michigan
 Grace Episcopal Church (Jonesville, Michigan), listed on the NRHP in Michigan
 Grace Episcopal Church (Mount Clemens, Michigan)
Grace Episcopal Church in Traverse City, Michigan

Mississippi
 Grace Episcopal Church (Rosedale, Mississippi), listed on the NRHP in Bolivar County, Mississippi

Missouri
 Grace Episcopal Church (Chillicothe, Missouri)
 Grace Episcopal Church (Kirkwood, Missouri), listed on the NRHP in St. Louis County, Missouri

New Jersey
 Grace Episcopal Church (Plainfield, New Jersey), NRHP-listed
 Grace Episcopal Church (Madison, New Jersey)
 Grace Church (Newark)

New Hampshire
 Grace Episcopal Church (Manchester, New Hampshire), listed on the New Hampshire State Register of Historic Places

New York
Grace Church (Manhattan), an Episcopal Parish church in New York City
Grace Church (Nyack, New York)
Grace Episcopal Church (Bronx, New York), located on City Island, listed on the NRHP in Bronx County, New York
Grace Episcopal Church Complex (Lyons, New York), listed on the NRHP in Wayne County, New York
Grace Episcopal Church (Middletown, New York), listed on the NRHP in Orange County, New York
Grace Episcopal Church Complex (Queens), listed on the NRHP in Queens County, New York
Grace Episcopal Church (Syracuse, New York), listed on the NRHP in Onondaga County, New York
Grace Episcopal Church (Waverly, New York), listed on the NRHP in Tioga County, New York
Grace Episcopal Church (Whitney Point, New York), listed on the NRHP in Broome County, New York

North Carolina
 Grace Episcopal Church, Morganton, North Carolina
 Grace Episcopal Church (Lexington, North Carolina), listed on the NRHP in Davidson County, North Carolina

 Grace Episcopal Church (Trenton, North Carolina), listed on the NRHP in Jones County, North Carolina
 Grace Episcopal Church (Weldon, North Carolina), listed on the NRHP in Halifax County, North Carolina

North Dakota
 Grace Episcopal Church (Jamestown, North Dakota), listed on the NRHP in Stutsman County, North Dakota
 Grace Episcopal Church (Minnewaukan, North Dakota), listed on the NRHP in Benson County, North Dakota
 Grace Episcopal Church (Pembina, North Dakota), listed on the NRHP in Pembina County, North Dakota

Ohio
 Grace Church (Cincinnati, Ohio), listed on the NRHP in Cincinnati, Ohio
 Grace Episcopal Church (Sandusky, Ohio), listed on the NRHP in Erie County, Ohio

Oregon
 Grace Episcopal Church (Astoria, Oregon)

South Carolina
Grace Episcopal Church (Charleston, South Carolina)

South Dakota
 Grace Episcopal Church (Huron, South Dakota), listed on the NRHP in Beadle County, South Dakota

Tennessee
 Grace Episcopal Church (Memphis, Tennessee), listed on the NRHP in Shelby County, Tennessee
 Grace Episcopal Church (Spring Hill, Tennessee), NRHP-listed

Texas
 Grace Episcopal Church (Cuero, Texas), NRHP-listed
 Grace Episcopal Church (Galveston, Texas), NRHP-listed
 Grace Episcopal Church (Georgetown, Texas), formerly NRHP-listed and now known as Grace Heritage Center

Virginia
 Grace Episcopal Church (Alexandria, Virginia)
 Grace Episcopal Church (Keswick, Virginia)
 Grace Episcopal Church (Kilmarnock, Virginia)
 Christ and Grace Episcopal Church (Petersburg, Virginia)

Washington, D.C.
 Grace Episcopal Church (Washington, D.C.)

Wisconsin
 Grace Episcopal Church (Madison, Wisconsin), listed on the NRHP in Dane County, Wisconsin
 Grace Episcopal Church (Sheboygan, Wisconsin)

See also
Grace Church (disambiguation)